Božidar Belojević (25 December 1928 – 24 April 1997) was a professional footballer who played for FK Partizan.

Biography
Belojević was born on 25 December 1928 in Podgorica. He started playing football as a boy, before the Second World War in Bar, and after the war he colonized in Lovćenac, in Bačka, with his parents, and there he started playing football again in the newly founded club Njegoš, together with his brother.

After one visit of Partizan after returning from Hungary, in 1952, Partizan and Njegoš played a friendly match that ended 1–1 and Belojević kept a clean sheet. Immediately after the match, Partizan signed him and went on a tour of South America.

Belojević was with Partizan until 1955, when he returned to his native Montenegro and continued his career with Budućnost from the then Titograd. He played until 1961, and one year before the end of his career he played for Borovo, then in the Second League.

As a member of Partizan, Belojević participated in winning two Yugoslav Cups, in 1952 and 1954. He died on 24 April 1997.

Honours
Partizan
 Yugoslav Cup: 1952, 1954

References

1928 births
1997 deaths
Footballers from Podgorica
Serbs of Montenegro
Serbian footballers
Yugoslav footballers
Association football goalkeepers
Yugoslav First League players
FK Partizan players
FK Budućnost Podgorica players
HNK Borovo players